CRCC Asia was founded in 2006 to give students and young professionals work experience in dynamic intercultural settings, increasing professional development and global understanding, and fostering business relations between China and the rest of the world.

As the leading provider of internships in Asia, CRCC Asia is active in the international education community, collaborating with colleagues in the field to establish best practice for international internships and setting the standard for innovative professional development program models in China and beyond. The company's international internship programs include extensive training and support during pre-departure, on the ground, and during re-entry phases of programming.

In recent years, the CRCC Asia Internship Program has earned major awards and worldwide recognition. As a testament to the global importance of understanding unique business cultures throughout Asia, CRCC Asia has formed strategic partnerships with over 65 universities worldwide, as well as with government bodies in the US, UK, Australia, New Zealand, Israel, and China.

History 
CRCC Asia was founded in September 2006 by Daniel Nivern and Edward Holroyd Pearce. They met during a master's degree program in international management for China at the University of London, and it was there that they realized the high potential of the Asian labor market and its culture.

They started the company with the idea of opening the borders between Asia and Western countries, and with a personal investment of £250 each, opened the first office in London at the end of 2007. In 2008, Tom Kirkwood, an entrepreneur with more than 20 years of business experience in China, became a strategic partner in the company.

The pioneering China Internship Program officially began in May 2008 and since then CRCC Asia has sent thousands of interns from over 150 countries on its various programs.

The CRCC Asia team consists of more than 60 employees, maintaining a commitment to executing one of the largest international internship programs in the world.

With three locations in Mainland China, two in Japan and programs in Vietnam, South Korea and the United Kingdom, CRCC Asia offers a wide range of experiences, spanning  various career fields, cultural environments and employability skills that young people need in the world today.

CRCC Asia Ltd also owns equity stakes in a number of diverse organisations including: The Student Lawyer, China Universities , and The Dragon Trip, creating an ecosystem of international education companies.

Internship Program 

CRCC Asia provides various programming options including internship program, placement-only program, and study and travel add-ons.

The internship program includes a guaranteed internship placement with an English speaking supervisor, accommodation, on-the-ground support, and activities throughout the time abroad. CRCC Asia also supports a range of customized programs including faculty-led trips across multiple disciplines and in 2019 launched ‘Employability Summits’ which are 5-14 day high-impact accessible short-term programs grounded in sector specific exposure along with cultural activities and exploration.

5 Key Learning Objectives 
All of CRCC Asia's programs are built around 5 Key Learning Objectives that have been developed in conjunction with advisors in the field of study abroad and international careers:

 Employability
 Cultural Agility
 Career Field Knowledge
 Country Specific Knowledge
 Global Connections

Government Partnerships 
CRCC Asia has an extensive partnership network not only with host companies, but also with universities and government programs across the world.

British Council Generation UK-China Initiative 
CRCC Asia has been a delivery partners of the British Council's Generation UK Programme for the past 5 years. The programme started in 2013 and aims to help 80,000 young professionals boost their global employability via programmes in China by 2020. CRCC Asia offers Generation UK programmes in Beijing, Shanghai, and Shenzhen.

The Ministry on Foreign Affairs of the State of Israel and the China-Israel Joint Economic Task Force 
2017 marked the first China-Israel Internship Program (CIIP) run by CRCC Asia. CIIP aims to create a growing pool of talented Israelis with practical experience in the Chinese market who will play key roles in both public and private sectors for the benefit of growing economic ties between China and Israel in the future. The China-Israel Internship Program is available for Israeli citizens, holders of an academic degree with at least two years of relevant work experience. CIIP provides a select number of Israeli nationals the opportunity to gain business experience in China by studying and interning for a period of 3 months in Beijing. The candidates are required to return to Israel after the end of the program.

China Education Association for International Exchange 
The China Immersion Program is a campus-based study and internship program combining culture and language study with a work placement in Beijing. The program is designed in cooperation with the China Education Association for International Exchange (CEAIE), and includes three weeks of intensive Mandarin and culture study, followed by a month-long internship. Throughout the program, participants will live on-campus at a university in Beijing in order to provide them with a more immersive experience.

University Partnerships 
Working from three regional offices in Philadelphia, London, and Brisbane, 75% of our students abroad come from direct partnerships with over 65+ universities and governments. These partnerships allow CRCC Asia to support individual students as well as custom cohorts to access professional development abroad. CRCC Asia provides universities with the resources to promote our programs to students, while also assisting with study abroad fairs, recruitment, pre-departure and reporting from on-the-ground.

CRCC Asia also builds custom programs based on expertise in Asia, employability, and global connections. Custom Programs can include excursions, such as camping on the Great Wall or exploring Mount Fuji; expert business panels; company visits; cultural events; classroom space; and much much more. Our short-term programming options now support Employability Summits, as well as faculty-led programs including support of Tokyo 2020 Olympic Programming.

Scholarships 
In November 2018, CRCC Asia launched the company's Social Responsibility initiative. This involved highlighting local charities on the ground in our Program Locations, in addition to the introduction of 5 new fully funded Scholarships for Inclusion. These scholarships included the CRCC Asia and KAHAL Abroad Scholarship for Jewish Students, the CRCC Asia and AHEAD Students with Disabilities Scholarship, the LGBTQ Scholarship, and the Symone D. Sanders Scholarship for Black Communities.

Awards & Media Coverage 
CRCC Asia's prominence in the international internship sector has seen it receive extensive media coverage along with industry recognition through awards and nominations

Recent media coverage has included:

TV Appearances 

 Sky News
 BBC Business Live 
 CCTV 
 CNBC Squawk Box

Press Features 

 The Independent
 New York Times
 Financial Times
 China Daily
 The Telegraph

Industry Awards/Nominations 

 GoAbroad Innovative New Program nomination
 GoAbroad Innovation in Philanthropy nomination
 GoAbroad Innovative Student Video nomination
 British Business Awards winner
 Cathay Pacific New Horizons Award winner

References

External links 
 

Employment agencies of the United Kingdom
Internships
Public employment service